Wang Liming (born 1960) is the Vice President of Renmin University of China and one of the foremost scholar of civil law in China.

Biography
Wang was born in Xiantao, Hubei Province, China.  He received his LL.B. degree from Hubei Institute of Finance and Economics (now known as Zhongnan University of Economics and Law) in 1981, and LL.M from Renmin University of China Department of Law in 1984.

After graduation, Wang joined the faculty of Renmin University Law School.  He received his LL.D degree from the same university in 1990.

In 1995, Wang Liming was selected as one of the "Ten Outstanding Young Jurists" by the China Law Society.

Wang was a visiting scholar at Harvard Law School from 1999 to 2000 and Yale Law School in 2004.

Wang was the Dean of Renmin University Law School from 2005 to 2009.

References

External links
 Wang Liming's Profile at Renmin University
 Professor Han Dayuan Appointed as Dean of Renda Law School (in Chinese)

1960 births
Chinese legal scholars
Harvard Law School alumni
Renmin University of China alumni
Academic staff of Renmin University of China
Living people
People from Xiantao